"The Unicorn and the Wasp" is the seventh episode of the fourth series of the revived British science fiction television series Doctor Who, which was aired on BBC One on 17 May 2008.

Set in an English manor house in 1926, shortly before the disappearance of crime fiction novelist Agatha Christie (played in the episode by Fenella Woolgar), the episode is a murder-mystery storyline where a shapeshifting giant wasp, in disguise as one of the party guests, murders the other guests using methods similar to those in the novels of Christie, who is also a guest.

Plot

The Tenth Doctor and Donna invite themselves to a dinner party hosted by Lady Eddison in 1926. One of the guests is Agatha Christie, and the Doctor realises that they have arrived on the day she inexplicably disappears. One of the guests, Professor Peach, is killed with a lead pipe in the library, where part of a burnt birth certificate is found.

While searching in a room that Lady Eddison shut herself in for six months in 1886, Donna sees a giant wasp outside. It smashes through the window and attacks Donna before escaping. The wasp then crushes the housekeeper, Miss Chandrakala, with a gargoyle. The Doctor, Donna, and Agatha chase the alien but it returns to human form before they can catch it. In the study, the Doctor identifies the killer as an alien wasp called a Vespiform. During a failed attempt to reveal the wasp at dinner, Lady Eddison's necklace is stolen and her son Roger Curbishley is stabbed in the back with a bread knife.

The remaining guests are assembled in the sitting room. When it is revealed the jewel thief’s toolkit Agatha found in the shrubbery likely came from Robina Redmond's bathroom window, Agatha reveals Redmond to be the jewel thief the Unicorn. The Doctor deduces that Lady Eddison's shutting herself away in 1886 was due to her becoming impregnated by another Vespiform in India, who had given her the necklace, before he died in the floods of 1885; unbeknownst to her, it links her telepathically with their child. Agatha deduces that Chandrakala took the child to an orphanage in 1886, and Professor Peach discovered Lady Eddison's secret. The Doctor further reveals that the child, whom she gave up for adoption, is Reverend Golightly, the killer. Via the telepathic link, the Reverend became aware of his alien nature, and inheritance, and absorbed the details of an Agatha Christie murder mystery that his mother was reading at the time.

Enraged, Golightly transforms into the Vespiform and threatens the guests. Agatha grabs the necklace and lures him away while driving towards the nearby Silent Pool. When Donna catches up with Agatha, she grabs the necklace and throws it into the water, prompting the Vespiform to dive in after it and drown. Due to her own connection with the necklace, Agatha falls unconscious and suffers from amnesia. The Doctor quietly drops Agatha off in Harrogate ten days later.

Continuity
The Doctor produces items from a chest of items beginning with the letter 'C', including a Cyberman chest-plate from "The Age of Steel", the head of a Greco-Roman statue (possibly depicting Caecilius from "The Fires of Pompeii"), and the crystal ball in which the Carrionites are trapped from "The Shakespeare Code" (which he playfully shakes).

Early in the episode, the Doctor states his desire to meet Agatha Christie. This is a reference to "Last of the Time Lords". Donna remarks that meeting Agatha Christie during a murder mystery would be as preposterous as meeting "Charles Dickens surrounded by ghosts at Christmas", unknowingly describing the events of "The Unquiet Dead". When Donna talks to Agatha about her cheating husband, she recalls her own engagement to Lance in which she found out he was using her, briefly mentioning the Empress of Racnoss as "a giant spider". This is a reference to the 2006 Christmas episode "The Runaway Bride".

The Doctor has a flashback scene when unravelling motives with Agatha Christie. He is shown in medieval Belgium with a bow and quiver of arrows on his back. His voiceover explains that he was deep in the Ardennes, looking for Charlemagne, who had been "kidnapped by an insane computer". Christie interrupts before he can paint a full picture; however the events are fully explored on Doctor Who's BBC website in the short story "The Lonely Computer."

Production

Writing
The episode is written by Gareth Roberts, who previously wrote the pseudohistorical episode "The Shakespeare Code". Roberts was given a fourth series episode to write after executive producer Russell T Davies reviewed Roberts' script for "The Shakespeare Code". Several months later, he received an email from the production team which said "Agatha Christie". The idea for a murder mystery featuring Agatha Christie came originally from producer Phil Collinson.

Roberts, a self-confessed fan of Christie's works, made the episode into a comedy.  Roberts based the episode on his favourite Christie works: Crooked House, which focuses on secrets within an aristocratic society, and the 1982 film adaptation of Evil Under the Sun. Speaking of both works, Roberts noted that it was "quite strange writing a modern Doctor Who with posh people in it. We don't really see posh people on television anymore, except at Christmas", and "there's something funny about the veneer of upper class respectability and the truth of any family underneath". He also stated that "there's really nothing nicer than watching a lot of English actors hamming it up in a vaguely exotic location... and then somebody's murdered!" The episode's title was deliberately chosen to sound "vaguely Christie-ish", but Roberts admitted that "[Christie] never used 'the blank and the blank' construction".

In writing the episode, Roberts aimed to make the episode a "big, fun, all-star murder mystery romp". He was influenced by advice given by Davies, who wanted Roberts to "go funnier" with every draft, and former Doctor Who script editor Douglas Adams' advice that "a danger one runs is that the moment you have anything in the script that's clearly meant to be funny in some way, everybody thinks 'oh well we can do silly voices and silly walks and so on', and I think that's exactly the wrong way to do it". Using this advice, he used the adage that in comedy, the characters do not realise the humour, and cited Basil Fawlty's mishaps in Fawlty Towers as an example.

In an interview with Doctor Who Magazine, Roberts stated that "to a certain extent [there was less pressure]" in writing the episode. He was pleased with the success of "The Shakespeare Code" and The Sarah Jane Adventures two-parter Whatever Happened to Sarah Jane?, but likened himself to Corporal Bell, a member of the administrative staff at the fictional Doctor Who organisation UNIT, in saying that he did not wish to be "in the middle of things" or writing episodes "where big, pivotal things have happened to [the Doctor]".

Roberts and Davies held an unofficial contest to see how many references to Christie's works could be inserted. Titles that were noted were: The Murder of Roger Ackroyd; Why Didn't They Ask Evans; The Body in the Library; The Secret Adversary; N or M?; Nemesis; Cat Among the Pigeons; Dead Man's Folly; They Do It With Mirrors; Appointment with Death; Cards on the Table; Sparkling Cyanide; Endless Night; Crooked House; Death in the Clouds; The Moving Finger; Taken at the Flood; Death Comes as the End; Murder on the Orient Express and The Murder at the Vicarage. A deleted scene referred to The Man in the Brown Suit, referring to the Doctor's clothing. The narrative itself parallels several of Christie's novels: the jewel theft storyline parallels The Secret of Chimneys; Miss Chandrakala's death was influenced by And Then There Were None; and the Colonel's revelation that he was not disabled paralleled a key concept of The Pale Horse. In an email conversation with journalist Benjamin Cook, Davies admitted he had initially added a reference to the original title of And Then There Were None, Ten Little Niggers, but decided it was too risky.

Cast notes
David Tennant's father Alexander McDonald had a silent cameo as a footman in one of the early scenes, after being asked to act when visiting David on set.

The casting of Fenella Woolgar as Agatha Christie was made at the suggestion of David Tennant, who had previously worked with her on Bright Young Things and He Knew He Was Right. She later played Hellan Femor in the audio play The Company of Friends and Morella Wendigo in Nevermore. Fenella Woolgar had previously appeared in an episode of Agatha Christie's Poirot, "Lord Edgware Dies" as Elis, and has since appeared in the episode "Hallowe'en Party" as Elizabeth Whittaker. David Quilter has also made an appearance, "The Million Dollar Bond Robbery".

Christopher Benjamin, who plays Colonel Curbishley, previously starred in two serials of the original Doctor Who series, playing Sir Keith Gold in Inferno (1970) and Henry Gordon Jago in The Talons of Weng-Chiang (1977).

Music
The music playing at the garden party is the "Twentieth Century Blues", originally from Noël Coward's 1931 play Cavalcade. The recording used here, edited together with other period music, is a 1931 recording of 'Love is the Sweetest Thing' by Ray Noble and the New Mayfair Orchestra, featuring vocalist Al Bowlly.

Editing
A framing device featuring the aged Agatha Christie (played by Daphne Oxenford) trying to recall the events that took place during her disappearance was deleted because the producers felt it diminished the story's urgency.  The original ending featured the Doctor and Donna visiting the elderly Christie; a new ending in the TARDIS set was filmed after the producers decided to cut the framing sequence, much later than the filming for the rest of the story.

The framing sequence and another scene cut for time are present on the Doctor Who Series 4 DVD box set.

Broadcast and reception
BARB figures show that "The Unicorn and the Wasp", was watched by 8.41 million viewers, making it the second most popular programme of the day (behind ITV's Britain's Got Talent) and the seventh most watched programme of the week.

Critical reception
The episode received an Appreciation Index score of 86 (considered "Excellent").

Ben Rawson-Jones of Digital Spy gave the episode four stars out of five. He claimed that style and substance "merge wonderfully in 'The Unicorn and The Wasp'", praising Gareth Roberts for his "deceptively frivolous story" managing to "successfully juggle many elements including the real life disappearance of Agatha Christie, a giant alien bug and a recreation of the classic 'whodunnit' murder mystery plot." However, he claimed that there was also an "air of predictability about all of the tongue-in-cheek references to Agatha Christie's body of work", citing prior serials that contain famous authors such as The Unquiet Dead and The Shakespeare Code. He then went on to say that these references managed to "excite rather than annoy", due to Roberts having "turned the entire plot into a Christie homage".

Jordan Thomas, the lead director of the game BioShock 2, stated that his creation of the game's character of Sofia Lamb was inspired by Fenella Woolgar's portrayal of Agatha Christie in this episode, and Woolgar was hired to voice the character. The game also has a character named Grace Holloway in it, a reference to the companion of the same name in the 1996 Doctor Who TV film.

Notes

References

External links

2008 British television episodes
Doctor Who pseudohistorical serials
Tenth Doctor episodes
Films with screenplays by Gareth Roberts (writer)
Fiction set in 1926
Television episodes set in England
Television episodes about murder
Cultural depictions of Agatha Christie